The International Nuclear and Radiological Event Scale (INES) was introduced in 1990 by the International Atomic Energy Agency (IAEA) in order to enable prompt communication of safety significant information in case of nuclear accidents.

The scale is intended to be logarithmic, similar to the moment magnitude scale that is used to describe the comparative magnitude of earthquakes. Each increasing level represents an accident approximately ten times as severe as the previous level. Compared to earthquakes, where the event intensity can be quantitatively evaluated, the level of severity of a human-made disaster, such as a nuclear accident, is more subject to interpretation. Because of this subjectivity the INES level of an incident is assigned well after the fact. The scale is therefore intended to assist in disaster-aid deployment.

Details 

A number of criteria and indicators are defined to assure coherent reporting of nuclear events by different official authorities. There are seven nonzero levels on the INES scale: three incident-levels and four accident-levels. There is also a level 0.

The level on the scale is determined by the highest of three scores: off-site effects, on-site effects, and defense in depth degradation.

Out of scale 

There are also events of no safety relevance, characterized as "out of scale".
Examples:
 5 March 1999: San Onofre, United States: Discovery of suspicious item, originally thought to be a bomb, in nuclear power plant.
 29 September 1999: H.B. Robinson, United States: A tornado sighting within the protected area of the nuclear power plant.
 17 November 2002, Natural Uranium Oxide Fuel Plant at the Nuclear Fuel Complex in Hyderabad, India: A chemical explosion at a fuel fabrication facility.

Criticism
Deficiencies in the existing INES have emerged through comparisons between the 1986 Chernobyl disaster, which had severe and widespread consequences to humans and the environment, and the 2011 Fukushima Daiichi nuclear accident, which caused no fatalities and comparatively small (10%) release of radiological material into the environment. The Fukushima Daiichi nuclear accident was originally rated as INES 5, but then upgraded to INES 7 (the highest level) when the events of units 1, 2 and 3 were combined into a single event and the combined release of radiological material was the determining factor for the INES rating.

One study found that the INES scale of the IAEA is highly inconsistent, and the scores provided by the IAEA incomplete, with many events not having an INES rating. Further, the actual accident damage values do not reflect the INES scores. A quantifiable, continuous scale might be preferable to the INES, in the same way that the antiquated Mercalli scale for earthquake magnitudes was superseded by the continuous physically-based Richter scale.

The following arguments have been proposed: firstly, the scale is essentially a discrete qualitative ranking, not defined beyond event level 7. Secondly, it was designed as a public relations tool, not an objective scientific scale. Thirdly, its most serious shortcoming is that it conflates magnitude and intensity. An alternative nuclear accident magnitude scale (NAMS) was proposed by British nuclear safety expert David Smythe to address these issues.

Nuclear Accident Magnitude Scale
The Nuclear Accident Magnitude Scale (NAMS) is an alternative to INES, proposed by David Smythe in 2011 as a response to the Fukushima Daiichi nuclear disaster.  There were some concerns that INES was used in a confusing manner, and NAMS was intended to address the perceived INES shortcomings.

As Smythe pointed out, the INES scale ends at 7; a more severe accident than Fukushima in 2011 or Chernobyl in 1986 would also be measured as INES category 7. In addition, it is not continuous, not allowing a fine-grained comparison of nuclear incidents and accidents. But then, the most pressing item identified by Smythe is that INES conflates magnitude with intensity; a distinction long made by seismologists to describe earthquakes. In that area, magnitude describes the physical energy released by an earthquake, while the intensity focuses on the effects of the earthquake. In analogy, a nuclear incident with a high magnitude (e.g. a core meltdown) may not result in an intense radioactive contamination, as the incident at the Swiss research reactor in Lucens shows – but yet it resides in INES category 4, together with the Windscale fire of 1957, which has caused significant contamination outside of the facility.

Definition 
The definition of the NAMS scale is:

 NAMS = log10(20 × R)

with R being the radioactivity being released in terabecquerels, calculated as the equivalent dose of iodine-131. Furthermore, only the atmospheric release affecting the area outside the nuclear facility is considered for calculating the NAMS, giving a NAMS score of 0 to all incidents which do not affect the outside. The factor of 20 assures that both the INES and the NAMS scales reside in a similar range, aiding a comparison between accidents. An atmospheric release of any radioactivity will only occur in the INES categories 4 to 7, while NAMS does not have such a limitation.

The NAMS scale still does not take into account the radioactive contamination of liquids such as an ocean, sea, river or groundwater pollution in proximity to any nuclear power plant.

An estimation of its magnitude seems to be related to the problematic definition of a radiological equivalence between different type of involved isotopes and the variety of paths by which activity might eventually be ingested, e.g. eating fish or through the food chain.

See also 

Nuclear meltdown
Core damage frequency
Fuel element failure
Loss-of-coolant accident
Nuclear power
Nuclear power debate
Radioactive contamination
Radioactive waste
Vulnerability of nuclear plants to attack
NRC Emergency Classifications
Nuclear and radiation accidents and incidents
Lists of nuclear disasters and radioactive incidents
List of civilian nuclear accidents
List of civilian radiation accidents
List of military nuclear accidents
United States military nuclear incident terminology
List of nuclear reactors
Nuclear safety and security
Criticality accident
List of hydroelectric power station failures

Notes and references

External links
Nuclear Events Web-based System (NEWS), IAEA
International Nuclear Event Scale factsheet, IAEA
  International Nuclear Event Scale, User's manual, IAEA, 2008

Nuclear safety and security
Nuclear